Övre Soppero is a locality situated in Kiruna Municipality, Norrbotten County, Sweden with 201 inhabitants in 2010.

References 

Populated places in Kiruna Municipality
Lapland (Sweden)
Populated places in Arctic Sweden